Red Canyon is a canyon located in Fremont County, Wyoming in the United States of America.  The uplift of the nearby Wind River Range 60 million years ago exposed sedimentary rocks that were eroded  by streams.  The canyon exposes a number of geologic formations including the Phosphoria Formation  from the Permian Period and the Chugwater Formation from the Triassic Period.  Oxidized iron deposits in the rocks give the canyon its name.  Red Canyon Creek drains the canyon and feeds into the Little Popo Agie River at the northern end.  The streams provide habitat for wildlife in an otherwise arid region.

There is evidence of over 10,000 years of human presence in the canyon, including the Shoshone and Washakie tribes which used it as a transportation corridor between South Pass and the Wind River Basin.  White settlers arrived during the 1870s and established farms on the floor of the canyon which provided fresh fruit and grains for nearby miners at South Pass City and Atlantic City.

Today, much of the canyon floor is owned by the Nature Conservancy which maintains the land as a working ranch.  The canyon is listed as a National Natural Landmark.

See also
 List of National Natural Landmarks in Wyoming

References

External links 
 National Natural Landmark - Red Canyon, National Park Service
 The Nature Conservancy - Red Canyon Ranch

Canyons and gorges of Wyoming
Protected areas of Fremont County, Wyoming
National Natural Landmarks in Wyoming
Landforms of Fremont County, Wyoming